Põllu is a village in Kehtna Parish, Rapla County, in central Estonia. As of 2011 Census, the settlement's population was 44.

Lelle cemetery is located in Põllu village.

References

Villages in Rapla County